Stathas (before 1928: Δούνιστα - Dounista) is a small mountain village and a community in western Greece. It is part of the Inachos municipal unit, Aetolia-Acarnania. At the 2011 census its population was 85 for the village, and 322 for the community, which includes the villages Potamia and Pavliada. The altitude of the village is 640 meters above sea level. The nearest major cities are Agrinio, Amfilochia and Arta.

History 

The village Dounista was renamed "Stathas" in 1928 after the famous 18th century armatolos Gerodimos Stathas, who came from Dounista. Other famous rebels, during the Turkish occupation of Greece, from the same village are:
Giannis Stathas (1758-1812) 
 Andreas Iskos
 Ioannis Iskos
 Chronis Iskos
 Dimitris Iskos or Karaiskos (who, according to a rumor, was the father of Georgios Karaiskakis, the famous fighter for the Greek independence).

Population

External links
Stathas on the municipal website
Stathas on GTP Travel Pages (in English and Greek)

See also

List of settlements in Aetolia-Acarnania

References 

Populated places in Aetolia-Acarnania